The Egyptian hieroglyph for "black" (𓆎) in Gardiner's sign list is numbered I6. The Wörterbuch der ägyptischen Sprache ('Dictionary of the Egyptian Language') lists no less than 24 different terms of km indicating 'black' such as black stone, metal, wood, hair, eyes, and animals, and in one instance applied to a person's name.

The most common explanation for the hieroglyph is under the Gardiner's Sign List, section I for "amphibious animals, reptiles, etc" is a crocodile skin with spines. Rossini and Schumann-Antelme propose that the crocodile skin hieroglyph actually shows claws coming out of the hide.

Besides 'black', the alternate use of the hieroglyph is for items terminating, coming-to-an-end, items of completion, hence a reference to charcoal, burning to its ending.

km.t

<div>Ancient Egypt is commonly referred to as  'km.t'  (one variant: 𓆎𓅓𓏏𓊖), believed to be a reference to the black Nile Delta earth. '𓊖' (the determinative O49) is used to designate the term for 'country, inhabited/cultivated land', called the niw.t (a political designate). It is a circle with a cross which represents a street, 'town intersection'.

The 198 BC Rosetta Stone uses the Black (hieroglyph) three times to make the name of Egypt: km.t. Of the 22 placename uses for the "name of ancient Egypt", 7 are for another name of Egypt as iAt-M17-G1-X1:., signifying the soil of Egypt, N30: X1*Z2-N30:N23-X1:Z1, which is the Greek form of "Egypt", signifying it as "the (divine) place of the mound (of creation)" and the fertile black soil of the land after the Inundation.Wörterbuch (Erman and Grapow 1926, "I": 26, 13), indicating it as a collateral term for exposed fertile black land of Egypt. (Note the doubled hieroglyph, '𓈇', Gardiner N23,  is used as the Two Lands, (Upper Egypt, and Lower Egypt), and the common use of "Ta-Mer-t", and additionally uses of  'Horus of the Two Lands' .)

In the Demotic (Egyptian) text of the Rosetta Stone, the demotic for Egypt is  'Kmi' . There are three uses of the actual Kmi, but 7 others referenced as Kmi refer to iAt in the hieroglyphs.  Other euphemistic references to Egypt in the Rosetta Stone include "Ta-Mer-t", which has the meaning of the 'full/fruitful/cultivated land', hr-tAwy, the 'lands of Horus', and tAwy, the "Two Lands."

 Kmi—spelling-"Egypt" —(22 places, synchronized, Demotic–Hieroglyphs)

demotic—hieroglyphs
–Kmi—Ta-Mer-t
–Kmi—Ta-Mer-t
–Kmi—rsy.t + mHt(i.e. South and North)(lands)
–Kmi—"Hr tAwy"
–Kmi—kmt-(restored)
–Kmi—Ta-Mer-t
–Kmi—Ta-Mer-t
–Kmi—iAt
–Kmi—kmt
–Kmi—"Hr tAwy"
–Kmi—Ta-Mer-t
–Kmi—iAt
–Kmi—iAt

demotic—hieroglyphs
14.–Kmi—XXXXXX-(omitted from text)
15.–Kmi—rsy.t + mHt(i.e. South and North)(lands)
16.–Bki—iAt
17.–Kmi—kmt
18.–Kmi—iAt
19.–Kmi—tAwy
20.–Kmi—iAt
21.–Kmi—iAt
22.–Kmi—Ta-Mer-t
--
--
--

Egyptian word examples, conclusion, completion, kmt, km iri

Coming to a conclusion, or completion is one use of the km hieroglyph in the words kmt and km iri ('to make an end'). The discussion of the biliteral states: The conclusion of a document, written in black ink, ending the work, has the same semantic connotation. (as km for 'concluding') The Rossini, Schumann-Antelme write-up states that initially the word comes from "shield", ikm, and thus the original association with the crocodile.

Alternative glyph, X5 equivalent, items burning black to an ending

Since the origin of the 'black' hieroglyph, and relationships to other forms showing vertical flame-like rises on the end of a flat-triangular shape, there has been discussion of this hieroglyph. As stated above, Schumann-Antelme and Rossini explain the crocodile skin, but with claws. The text by Egyptologists Mark Collier and Bill Manley describes the same "crocodile skin", Gardiner I6, as burning charcoal with flames.

Skin, I6 entry in 1920 Budge "dictionary"
The 1920 Budge dictionary, which is actually a compilation of ~200 referenced works, and ~120 authors has the following breakdown of the km entry. It is listed under "K"-(gardiner V31),V31 a third of the way into K. A small summary of the entries, and their referenced works follow:

The last three of four entries ending the 27 entries deal with black stones, or powders and black plants, or seeds; (all small multiple, plural, grains-of, items). They are preceded by entries 21 and 22, a "buckler", or "shield", and "black wood". Entry 26 is an image, or statue, using the vertical mummy hieroglyph gardiner A53, ("in the form of", "the custom of"). These last six entries are unreferenced.

The first 4 of 5 entries, kam, kam-t, or kamkam all deal with items coming to an end. (Entry four is untranslated and is from Pap. 3024, Lepsius, Denkmaler-(papyrus).) The references for the others in the first five are: Peasant, Die Klagen des Bauern, 1908., Thes.-(Thesaurus Inscriptionum Aegyptiacarum, Brugsch);. A. Z.-(twice);<ref>Budge, Ibid. (Zeitschrift fur Agypttische Sprache und Alterthumskunde, in progress) p. lxxxviii.</ref> Shipwreck., 118-(Tale of the shipwrecked sailor); Amen.-(author: Amen-em-apt); and Thes. (again).

Entries 6 to 20 deal with "black" or gods, or named items. Only 8 of these items reference black, but start by also referring to Coptic. Entries 6, 7, and 8 refer to coptic "KAME", for 6 and 8; entry 7 to coptic "KMOM", "KMEM". For entry 7, to be black, Budge also references Revue-(Rev.); for entry 8, black items, Budge also references T.-(King Teta); and N.-(Pepi II-(King Nefer-ka-Ra). The other hieroglyph word entries of entry 9 to 20, have about fifteen further references, all starting with the km hieroglyph.

On the other hand, the works of Budge have not held up well in terms of recent hieroglyph scholarship since the 1930s.  Even during Budge's own lifetime, many Egyptological scholars disputed Budge's interpretation of glyphs and texts.  Today, no modern Egyptological scholar relies upon the works of E. A. W. Budge as evidence of proper glyph rendering, by either his translation or transliteration (his transliteration system was unique to Budge alone as most Egyptologists then (and today) relied upon the transcription and transliteration system developed by the Berlin School which issued the master compendium of Egyptian hieroglyphic language in 1926, Wörterbuch der Aegyptischen Sprache (7 Vols.), and which is detailed in the publication by A. H. Gardiner, Egyptian Grammar: Being an Introduction to the Study of Hieroglyphs (1957)).  As such, references to Budge's dictionary and within Budge's dictionary are considered highly suspect by most Egyptologists today, as they do not actually relate back to the terms as he defined them.

Shield

"Shield", ikm and another word with an approximate km cognate,  'khm starting with the vowel ( ' ),  'khm, meaning to put to an end are the possible words related to the origins of the crocodile skin, and the 'verb of action', of items coming to an end. The second word  'khm has nine entries in the Budge dictionary, shield, ikam, has two entries.

See also
Gardiner's Sign List#I. Amphibious Animals, Reptiles, etc.
List of Egyptian hieroglyphs
Name of Egypt
Kmt (journal)
Mnewer, the black bull: "Black-Great (One)", Kemwer-(Km-wr'')

References

I6